Ectoedemia liebwerdella is a moth of the family Nepticulidae. It occurs locally in central and southern Europe, east to the Volga and Ural regions of Russia.

The wingspan is 6.6–8 mm. The larvae normally have a two-year cycle, they feed during two summers and overwinter twice to pupate in May–July.  Adults are on wing from early July to August.

The larvae feed on various Fagus and Quercus species. Unlike most other Nepticulidae species, the larvae mine the bark of their host, rather than the leaves. The mine consists of a contorted gallery in bark of trunks or thick branches. The larva feeds mainly in the direction of the main axis. It is especially abundant on the sunny side of trees.

External links
Nepticulidae from the Volga and Ural region
Fauna Europaea
A Taxonomic Revision Of The Western Palaearctic Species Of The Subgenera Zimmermannia Hering And Ectoedemia Busck s.str. (Lepidoptera, Nepticulidae), With Notes On Their Phylogeny

Nepticulidae
Moths of Europe
Moths described in 1940